Pukara (Aymara for fortress, also spelled Pucara) is a  mountain in the Andes of Bolivia which reaches a height of approximately . It is located in the Oruro Department, San Pedro de Totora Province. Pukara lies west of T'iwu (Tibo), southwest of the village and the mountain named Antiti at a lake named Ch'uxña Quta ("green lake", also spelled Chojña Kkota).

References 

Mountains of Oruro Department